The 39th AVN Awards was a pornography awards ceremony recognizing the best actresses, actors, directors and films in the adult industry in 2021. The 39th edition of the ceremony which began in 1984 encompassed 120 categories involving content creation, production, retail and web/tech forums in the adult industry. The ceremony was held virtually on January 22, 2022, and streamed on Adult Video News' AVNStars.com.

Show overview

Hosts 
On November 30, 2021, adult performers Mia Malkova and Mighty Emelia were announced as co-hosts for the show.

Winners and nominees 
The nominees for the 39th AVN Awards were announced on November 19, 2021.

The winners were announced during the awards ceremony on January 22, 2022.

Major awards 
Winners of categories announced during the awards ceremony are highlighted in boldface and indicated with a double dagger.

{| class="wikitable" role="presentation"
| style="vertical-align:top; width:50%;"| 
 Gianna Dior
 Aiden Ashley
 Vanna Bardot
 Lulu Chu
 Avery Cristy
 Gia Derza
 Emma Hix
 Kenna James
 Kira Noir
 Kenzie Reeves
 Scarlit Scandal
 Alexis Tae
 Angela White
 Jane Wilde
 Emily Willis
| style="vertical-align:top; width:50%;"| 
 Tommy Pistol
 Mick Blue
 Dante Colle
 Xander Corvus
 Charles Dera
 Manuel Ferrara
 Oliver Flynn
 Seth Gamble
 Quinton James
 Isiah Maxwell
 Ramón Nomar
 Jax Slayher
 Codey Steele
 Michael Stefano
 Zac Wild
|-
| style="vertical-align:top; width:50%;"| 
 Kenna James – Under the Veil, MissaX
 Aiden Ashley – Blue Moon Rising, MissaX
 Casey Calvert – Primary Season 2, Lust Cinema
 Gianna Dior – Psychosexual, Vixen Media Group
 Aila Donovan – Toxic, Sweet Sinner/Mile High
 Ana Foxxx – Sweet Sweet Sally Mae, Adult Time/Pulse
 Mariska – Betrayal, Dorecl/Pulse
 Maitland Ward – Muse Season 2, Deeper
 Jane Wilde – Succubus, BurningAngel Entertainment
 Emily Willis – Influence Emily Willis, Vixen Media Group
| style="vertical-align:top; width:50%;"| 
 Tommy Pistol – Under the Veil, MissaX
 Mick Blue – Tell Her, Deeper/Pulse
 Dante Colle – Casey: A True Story, Adult Time
 Xander Corvus – Survive the Night, Digital Playground/Pulse
 Duke Daybreak – Ink Motel 3, AltErotic/Stunner
 Seth Gamble – Gods & Sinners, Wicked Pictures
 Small Hands – Succubus, BurningAngel Entertainment
 Quinton James – Toxic, Sweet Sinner/Mile High
 Scott Nails – Kill Code 87, Digital Playground/Pulse
 Derrick Pierce – Primary Season 2, Lust Cinema
|-
| style="vertical-align:top; width:50%;"| 
 Lacy Lennon – Black Widow XXX: An Axel Braun Parody, Wicked Comix
 Siri Dahl – Third Wheel, Pure Taboo
 Elena Koshka – Something Borrowed, MissaX
 Melody Marks – My New Family, AllHerLuv
 Kenzie Reeves – Her Spitting Image, Pure Taboo
 Jessie Saint – Quarantine, Up to and Including Her Limits, Deeper/Pulse
 Violet Starr – The Scheme, A POV Story
 Victoria Voxxx – One Man's Trash, Pure Taboo
 Mona Wales – Worth the Trouble, Deeper
 Maya Woulfe – Spark, Lust Cinema
| style="vertical-align:top; width:50%;"| 
 Tommy Pistol – Second Chance, MissaX
 Nathan Bronson – The Scheme, A POV Story
 Dante Colle – Spark, Lust Cinema
 Xander Corvus – Fashionista Provocateuse, Digital Playground
 Seth Gamble – Black Widow XXX: An Axel Braun Parody, Wicked Comix
 Steve Holmes – Deny It All You Want, Pure Taboo
 Brad Newman – Her Spitting Image, Pure Taboo
 Pierce Paris – The Widow, Pure Taboo
 Will Pounder – Can Never Make It Up to You, Pure Taboo
 Codey Steele – The Cure, MissaX/Pulse
|-
| style="vertical-align:top; width:50%;"| 
 Casey: A True Story, Adult Time
 Blue Moon Rising, MissaX
 Kill Code 87, Digital Playground/Pulse
 Love, Sex & Lawyers, Adam & Eve Pictures
 Muse Season 2, Deeper
 Primary Season 2, Lust Cinema
 Psychosexual, Vixen Media Group
 Survive the Night, Digital Playground/Pulse
 Toxic, Sweet Sinner/Mile High
 Under the Veil, MissaX
| style="vertical-align:top; width:50%;"| 
 Black Widow XXX: An Axel Braun Parody, Wicked Comix The Cure, MissaX/Pulse
 Deny It All You Want, Pure Taboo
 Fairest of Them All, Transfixed/Adult Time
 Murder Mystery, ForPlay Films
 Quarantine, Up to and Including Her Limits, Deeper/Pulse
 Second Chance, MissaX
 Spark, Lust Cinema
 The Widow, Pure Taboo
 Worth the Trouble, Deeper
|-
| style="vertical-align:top; width:50%;"| 
 Kira Noir – Casey: A True Story, Adult Time Brooklyn Gray – Blue Moon Rising, MissaX
 Ryan Keely – Matriarch, Digital Playground/Pulse
 Helena Locke – Under the Veil, MissaX
 Misha Montana – Ink Motel 3, AltErotic/Stunner
 Jessa Rhodes – Kill Code 87, Digital Playground/Pulse
 Scarlett Sage – Written in the Stars, AllHerLuv/Pulse
 Charlotte Stokely – Under the Veil, MissaX
 Misty Stone – Sweet Sweet Sally Mae, Adult Time/Pulse
 Victoria Voxxx – Primary Season 2, Lust Cinema
| style="vertical-align:top; width:50%;"| 
 Tommy Pistol – Casey: A True Story, Adult Time A.J., Muse Season 2 – Deeper
 Stirling Cooper – Survive the Night, Digital Playground/Pulse
 Charles Dera – Casey: A True Story, Adult Time
 Manuel Ferrara – Muse Season 2, Deeper
 Oliver Flynn – Psychosexual, Vixen Media Group
 Steve Holmes – Under the Veil, MissaX
 Ricky Johnson – Red Light Arena, Digital Playground/Pulse
 Ryan Mclane – Toxic, Sweet Sinner/Mile High
 Michael Vegas – Kill Code 87, Digital Playground/Pulse
|-
| style="vertical-align:top; width:50%;"| 
 Little Caprice Ginebra Bellucci
 Anna de Ville
 Cassie del Isla
 Clea Gaultier
 Angelika Grays
 Tina Kay
 Cherry Kiss
 Jia Lissa
 Baby Nicols
 Kaisa Nord
 Liya Silver
 Sybil
 Rebecca Volpetti
 Zaawaadi
| style="vertical-align:top; width:50%;"| 
 Alberto Blanco Sam Bourne
 Tommy Cabrio
 Kristof Cale
 Christian Clay
 Raul Costa
 Charlie Dean
 Dorian del Isla
 Erik Everhard
 Maximo Garcia
 Angleo Godshack
 Freddy Gong
 Vince Karter
 Joss Lescaf
 Steve Q
|-
| style="vertical-align:top; width:50%;"| 
 Blake Blossom Alina Ali
 Gizelle Blanco
 Anna Claire Clouds
 Destiny Cruz
 Kayley Gunner
 Lily Larimar
 Coco Lovelock
 Maddy May
 April Olsen
 Freya Parker
 Kylie Rocket
 Sera Ryder
 Maya Woulfe
 Angel Youngs
| style="vertical-align:top; width:50%;"| 
 Casey Kisses Melanie Brooks
 Erica Cherry
 Korra Del Rio
 Aubrey Kate
 Nicole Knight
 Lianna Lawson
 Natalie Mars
 Ivory Mayhem
 Lena Moon
 Roxxie Moth
 Angelina Please
 Emma Rose
 Daisy Taylor
 Crystal Thayer
|-
| style="vertical-align:top; width:50%;"| 
 Ricky Greenwood Joanna Angel
 Mick Blue
 Kay Brandt
 Casey Calvert
 Jonni Darkko
 Julia Grandi
 Kayden Kross
 Pat Myne
 Mike Quasar
 Rocco Siffredi
 B. Skow
 Laurent Sky
 Jacky St. James
 Billy Visual
| style="vertical-align:top; width:50%;"| 
 Psychosexual, Vixen Media Group – Gabrielle Anex Black Widow XXX: An Axel Braun Parody, Wicked Comix – Axel Braun
 Blue Moon Rising, MissaX – Jess X & Missa X
 Casey: A True Story, Adult Time – Angelo Poirier
 I Am Aubrey, Evil Angel Films – John Stagliano
 Love, Sex & Lawyers, Adam & Eve Pictures – Hollywood Max
 Muse Season 2, Deeper – Duboko
 Primary Season 2, Lust Cinema – Bryn Pryor
 Red Light Arena, Digital Playground/Pulse – Margot Misandry, Papa McMuffin & Alexplose
 Sweet Sweet Sally Mae, Adult Time/Pulse – Sean Aitch
|-
| style="vertical-align:top; width:50%;"| 
 Mistress Maitland 2, Deeper/Pulse – Set Walker Blue Moon Rising, MissaX – Matt Holder
 Casey: A True Story, Adult Time – Mike Quasar & David Lord
 Consumed by Desire 2, Bellesa/Mile High – Steve Matts & Ralph Parfait
 Fantasy Roleplay 5, Erotica X/O.L. Entertainment – James Avalon
 Glamcore, Wicked Pictures – Axel Braun & Chris Alessandra
 Kill Code 87, Digital Playground/Pulse – Francois Clousot
 One Night in Barcelona, Dorcel/Pulse – Alis Locanta
 Primary Season 2, Lust Cinema – Bryn Pryor
 Top Girls, Jacquie & Michel Elite – Pascal Luka
| style="vertical-align:top; width:50%;"| 
 Casey: A True Story'', Adult Time
 Blue Moon Rising, MissaX
 Future Darkly: Pandemic, Adult Time/Pulse
 Glamcore, Wicked Pictures
 Influence Emily Willis, Vixen Media Group
 J&M Airlines, Jacquie & Michel Elite
 Primary Season 2, Lust Cinema
 Psychosexual, Vixen Media Group
 Sweet Sweet Sally Mae, Adult Time/Pulse
 Unbound, Digital Playground/Pulse
|}

 Additional award winners 

VIDEO & WEB
 Best Anal Movie or Limited Series: Angela Loves Anal 3, AGW/Girlfriend
 Best Anal Series or Channel: V., Tushy Raw/Pulse
 Best Anal Sex Scene: Gianna Dior & Mick Blue – Psychosexual Part 2, Tushy/Vixen
 Best Anthology Movie or Limited Series: Auditions, Deeper/Pulse
 Best Anthology Series or Channel: Natural Beauties, Vixen/Pulse
 Best Art Direction: Muse Season 2, Deeper
 Best BDSM Movie or Limited Series: Diary of a Madman, Kink/Digital Sin
 Best Blowbang Scene: Savannah Bond – Savannah Bond Beach Bikini Slut Sc. 2, Darkko/Evil Angel
 Best Boy/Girl Sex Scene: Gianna Dior & Troy Francisco – Psychosexual Part 1, Blacked Raw/Vixen
 Best Curve Appeal Movie or Limited Series: Rack Focus 2, Jules Jordan Video
 Best Directing – Banner/Network: Jules Jordan – Jules Jordan Video
 Best Directing – International Production: Julia Grandi – Jia, Vixen Media Group
 Best Directing – Narrative Production: Kayden Kross – Psychosexual, Vixen Media Group
 Best Directing – Non-Narrative Production: Jules Jordan – Flesh Hunter 15, Jules Jordan Video
 Best Double-Penetration Sex Scene: Angela Loves Anal 3 – Scene 4, AGW/Girlfriends – Angela White, Michael Stefano & John Strong
 Best Foursome/Orgy Sex Scene: Marica Hase, Lulu Chu, Scarlit Scandal, Mona Wales, Destiny Cruz & Oliver Flynn – Chaired, Deeper
 Best Gangbang Scene: Influence Emily Willis Part 4, Blacked/Vixen – Emily Willis, Rob Piper, Anton Harden, Isiah Maxwell & Tee Reel 
 Best Girl/Girl Sex Scene: Light Me Up, Explicit Acts, Slayed – Vanna Bardot & Emily Willis
 Best Gonzo/Compendium Movie or Limited Series: Flesh Hunter 15, Jules Jordan Video
 Best Gonzo/Compendium Series or Channel: V., Blacked Raw/Pulse
 Best Group Sex Movie or Limited Series: Angela Loves Threesomes 3, AGW/Girlfriends
 Best Ingenue Movie or Limited Series: Ripe 10, Jules Jordan Video
 Best Ingenue Series or Channel: Bratty Sis, Nubiles
 Best International Anal Sex Scene: Jia Episode 4, Tushy/Vixen – Jia Lissa & Christian Clay 
 Best International Boy/Girl Sex Scene: Give In, Vibes 3, Vixen/Pulse – Lexi Belle & Alberto Blanco
 Best International Group Sex Scene: Better Together, Vibes 4, Vixen/Pulse – Emily Willis, Little Caprice, Apolonia Lapiedra & Alberto Blanco
 Best International Lesbian Sex Scene: Caprice Divas Luscious, Little Caprice Dreams – Little Caprice & Lottie Magne
 Best International Production: One Night in Barcelona, Dorcel/Pulse
 Best Lesbian Group Sex Scene: We Live Together Season 1 – Episode 4: Saying Goodbye, Reality Kings/Pulse – Gina Valentina, Emily Willis, Gia Derza & Autumn Falls
 Best Lesbian Movie or Limited Series: TIE - Lesbian Ghost Stories 5, Girlfriends Films & Sweet Sweet Sally Mae, Adult Time/Pulse
 Best Lesbian Series or Channel: Women Seeking Women, Girlfriends Films
 Best Makeup: Blue Moon Rising, MissaX; Alexxx Moon 
 Best Male Newcomer: Anton Harden
 Best MILF/Mixed-Age Fantasy Series or Channel: Manuel Is a MILF-o-Maniac, Jules Jordan Video
 Best MILF Movie or Limited Series: MILF Performers of the Year 2021, Elegant Angel Productions
 Best Mixed-Age Fantasy Movie or Limited Series: Moms Teach Sex 26, Nubiles/Pulse
 Best New International Starlet: Romy Indy
 Best New Production Banner: Slayed
 Best Niche Movie or Limited Series: Choked and Soaked 5, Belladonna/Evil Angel
 Best Niche Series or Channel: Teen Creampies, Hard X/O.L. Entertainment
 Best Non-Sex Performance: Derrick Pierce – Casey: A True Story, Adult Time
 Best Oral Series or Channel: Swallowed, Lit Up/Evil Angel
 Best Oral Sex Scene: Oral Queens Riley Reid and Skin Diamond Give Spit Filled Sloppy BJ, Jules Jordan Video – Riley Reid, Skin Diamond & Winston Burbank
 Best POV Sex Scene: Kenzie Reeves Is Out of This World, MrLuckyPOV – Kenzie Reeves & Mr. Lucky

Content (ctd.)
 Best Screenplay: Casey: A True Story, Adult Time – Casey Kisses, Joanna Angel & Shawn Alff
 Best Screenplay – Featurette: Black Widow XXX: An Axel Braun Parody, Wicked Comix – Axel Braun
 Best Solo/Tease Performance: Angela Loves Threesomes 3 – Scene 1, AGW/Girlfriends – Angela White & Gabbie Carter
 Best Star Showcase: Influence Emily Willis, Vixen Media Group
 Best Taboo Relations Movie or Limited Series: Family Cheaters, Family Sinners/Mile High
 Best Tag-Team Sex Scene: Psychosexual Part 4, Blacked/Vixen – Gianna Dior, Rob Piper & Jax Slayher
 Best Thespian – Trans/X: Casey Kisses – Casey: A True Story, Adult Time
 Best Three-Way Sex Scene: Another Person, Deeper – Vanna Bardot, Avery Cristy & Oliver Flynn
 Best Trans Group Sex Scene: Succubus – Part 4, BurningAngel Entertainment; Aubrey Kate, Jane Wilde & Small Hands
 Best Trans Movie or Limited Series: I Am Aubrey, Evil Angel Films
 Best Trans Newcomer: Jade Venus
 Best Trans One-on-One Sex Scene: Succubus – Part 1, BurningAngel Entertainment – Aubrey Kate & Small Hands
 Best Trans Series or Channel: TS Taboo, TransSensual/Mile High
 Best Virtual Reality Sex Scene: Star Wars The Mandalorian: Ahsoka Tano A XXX Parody, VRCosplayX – Alexis Tae & Nathan Bronson
 Clever Title of the Year: Invading Uranus, Evil Angel
 Lesbian Performer of the Year: Serene Siren
 Mainstream Venture of the Year: Age of Regret (Music Album) – Small Hands
 MILF Performer of the Year: Alexis Fawx
 Mark Stone Award for Outstanding Comedy: Black Widow XXX: An Axel Braun Parody'', Wicked Comix
 Most Outrageous Sex Scene: Anal Slime Bath, Secret Crush/Evil Angel; Scarlet Chase
 Niche Performer of the Year: Daisy Ducati

PLEASURE PRODUCTS
 Best Enhancement Manufacturer: Wicked Sensual Care
 Best Fetish Manufacturer: Sportsheets
 Best Lingerie or Apparel Line: Envy Menswear
 Best Lubricant Brand: System Jo
 Best Pleasure Products Manufacturer – Large: CalExotics
 Best Pleasure Products Manufacturer – Medium: OhMiBod
 Best Pleasure Products Manufacturer – Small: VUSH

RETAIL
 Best Boutique: Trystology, Ventura, CA
 Best Retail Chain – Large: Romanti
 Best Retail Chain – Medium: Good Vibrations
 Best Retail Chain – Small: Chi Chi LaRue’s
 Best Web Retail Store: Bellesa Boutique

FAN-VOTED AVN AWARD WINNERS
 Favorite Female Porn Star: Angela White
 Most Spectacular Boobs: Angela White
 Most Epic Ass: Abella Danger
 Hottest MILF: Kendra Lust
 Social Media Star: Angela White
 Favorite Indie Clip Star: Eva Elfie
 Hottest Newcomer: Blake Blossom
 Favorite Camming Cosplayer: Purple Bitch
 Favorite Camming Couple: 19honeysuckle (aka Honey & Tom Christian)
 Favorite Domme: Brittany Andrews
 Favorite Trans Porn Star: Ella Hollywood
 Favorite Male Porn Star: Johnny Sins
 Favorite Cam Girl: Happy Yulia
 Favorite BBW Star: BadKittyyy
 Favorite Trans Cam Star: Casey Kisses
 Favorite Cam Guy: Arthur Eden aka Webcam God

References

External links 
 

AVN Awards
2021 film awards
2022 awards in the United States
Virtual events
January 2022 events in the United States